Egidijus Vaitkūnas (born 8 August 1988) is a Lithuanian footballer who plays for FA Šiauliai and Lithuania national football team as a right back.

Achievements 
 FK Žalgiris (from Vilnius)
 2012, 2013, 2014, 2015, 2016 Lithuanian Cup winner
 2013, 2016, 2017 Lithuanian Super Cup winner
 2013, 2015, 2016 Lithuanian Championship winner

References

External links
 
 

1988 births
Living people
Footballers from Vilnius
Lithuanian footballers
Association football defenders
Lithuania international footballers
Lithuanian expatriate footballers
Expatriate footballers in the Czech Republic
Expatriate footballers in Belarus
Lithuanian expatriate sportspeople in the Czech Republic
A Lyga players
Czech First League players
FK Žalgiris players
FK Tauras Tauragė players
FK Banga Gargždai players
Bohemians 1905 players
FC Minsk players
FK Kauno Žalgiris players